Daragh McCarthy is a Dublin born film-maker and musician. He has directed numerous video clips included early videos for The Frames, a Dublin group led by Academy Award winning Glen Hansard.

In 1996 he produced and directed the hardcore punk documentary The Stars Are Underground. Among his recent projects is Teo a documentary currently in production. Teo is a film documentary about jazz musician and producer Teo Macero.  It was filmed over the last five years of Macero's life.

McCarthy went to St. David's CBS, Artane in Dublin.

See also 
 Teo Macero
 The Stars Are Underground

References

External links 
 Short clip from "Teo" a documentary in production directed by Daragh McCarthy.
 Teo Macero obituary by John Fordham and an appreciation by Daragh McCarthy from the Guardian newspaper. retrieved 28 Feb 2008.

Film people from Dublin (city)
Year of birth missing (living people)
Living people
Irish film directors